Abigail "Abi" Walker is a Scottish surgeon and retired international female field hockey goalkeeper. She made 65 appearances for the Women's National Team and won 17 caps for Great Britain.

Biography
Walker studied medicine at the University of Glasgow and qualified as a doctor in 2006. She passed her postgraduate examinations and gained MRCS in 2009. 

Walker played for Canterbury Hockey Club and Bearsden. She gained her first cap for Scotland against Chile in 2003. In February 2013, she announced her decision to retire from international competition, having made 65 appearances for the Scotland team.

In 2018, Walker was selected as a Churchill Fellow to investigate treatments for adults and children with facial pain in the United States.

References

External links 
 

Living people
Scottish female field hockey players
Female field hockey goalkeepers
21st-century Scottish medical doctors
Alumni of the University of Glasgow Medical School
Scottish surgeons
Field hockey players at the 2010 Commonwealth Games
Field hockey players at the 2012 Summer Olympics
Scottish women medical doctors
21st-century women physicians
Surbiton Hockey Club players
Year of birth missing (living people)
Olympic field hockey players of Great Britain
Commonwealth Games competitors for Scotland